Wilfried Reybrouck (born 27 January 1953 in Bruges) is a former Belgian cyclist. He is the brother of Guido Reybrouck and the nephew of Gustave Danneels, both former cyclists.

In 1974, as his first year as a professional, Reybrouck attacked on the first stage of the Giro d'Italia with 400 meters to go and won the stage.

Major results
1974
 1st Stage 1 Giro d'Italia
1975
 1st Stage 3 Ronde van Nederland
 1st Overall Grande Prémio Jornal de Notícias
 2nd De Kustpijl
 2nd Trofeo Luis Puig
1977
 5th Omloop van de Vlaamse Scheldeboorden
1979
 10th Omloop van de Vlaamse Scheldeboorden

References

External links

Belgian male cyclists
1953 births
Living people
Belgian Giro d'Italia stage winners
Sportspeople from Bruges
Cyclists from West Flanders
20th-century Belgian people